Miss Universe 2017 was the 66th Miss Universe pageant, held at The AXIS at Planet Hollywood in Las Vegas, Nevada, United States on November 26, 2017.

At the end of the event, Iris Mittenaere of France crowned Demi-Leigh Nel-Peters of South Africa as Miss Universe 2017. It is South Africa's first victory in almost 4 decades, and the second victory of the country in the pageant's history.

Contestants from 92 countries and territories competed in this year's pageant, surpassing the previous record of 89 contestants in 2011 and 2012. The pageant was hosted by Steve Harvey in his third consecutive year, and supermodel Ashley Graham. Television personality Carson Kressley and runway coach Lu Sierra provided commentary and analysis throughout the event. American singer-songwriters Fergie and Rachel Platten performed in this year's pageant.

The competition also featured the return of the Phoenix Mikimoto crown, which was last used in 2007, after WME/IMG reportedly sued the Diamond International Company due to a breach of contract in August 2017. After failing to make to payments, IMG canceled the contract to DIC.

Background

Location and date 
Miss Universe Australia organization's Troy Barbagallo, Australian businessman, informed the Herald Sun that he submitted an offer to IMG for Australia to host the 2017 edition, with Sydney or Melbourne as viable host cities.

The Department of Tourism of the Philippines announced on May 25, 2017, that the Miss Universe Organization had proposed to hold the contest again in the Philippines. The Miss Universe 2016 pageant took place in the nation. The Miss Universe Organization was pleased with the previous pageant's hosting in the Philippines, stating it dominated the pre-events of Super Bowl LI. On June 22, 2017, the Department of Tourism decided that they will not host the pageant this year and instead consider hosting the following edition.

On September 28, 2017, the Miss Universe Organization confirmed the date and location of the contest through Instagram. The pageant will take place in The AXIS theatre of Planet Hollywood in Las Vegas, Nevada on November 26, 2017. The last time that The AXIS theatre was used by the pageant was in 2015.

Selection of participants 
Contestants from 92 countries and territories were selected to compete in the pageant. Fourteen of these delegates were appointees to their titles after being a runner-up of their national pageant or an audition process or other internal selection, while three were selected to replace the original dethroned winner.

Liesbeth Claus, the third runner-up of Miss Belgium 2017, was appointed to represent Belgium after Romanie Schotte, Miss Belgium 2017, chose to compete at Miss World 2017 due to conflicting schedules of the two pageants. Kseniya Alexandrova, the first runner-up of Miss Russia 2017, was also appointed to represent Russia after Polina Popova, Miss Russia 2017, chose to compete at Miss World 2017. Katarzyna Włodarek, the second runner-up of Miss Polonia 2016, was appointed to represent Poland after the Miss Polonia pageant was postponed to late November following the Miss Universe pageant.

Mira Simeonova, Miss Universe Bulgaria 2017, originally was supposed to represent Bulgaria at Miss Universe. However, Simeonova did not meet the minimum age requirements of the pageant. Due to this, Nikoleta Todorova, a finalist at Miss Universe Bulgaria 2017, replaced Simeonova as Miss Universe Bulgaria 2017. Vian Sulaimani was supposed to represent Iraq at Miss Universe. However, Sulaimani was dethroned after it was discovered that she was married. Following Sulaimani's dethronement, the Miss Iraq Organization held a casting call to select the new representative of Iraq to Miss Universe. Sarah Idan emerged as the new Miss Iraq 2017. Pınar Tartan, Miss Turkey Supranational 2017, replaced Aslı Sümen as Miss Universe 2017 after Sümen replaced Itır Esen as Miss Turkey World 2017 hours after her crowning because of a tweet about the 2016 Turkish coup d'état attempt.

The 2017 edition saw the debuts of Cambodia, Laos, and Nepal and the returns of Egypt, El Salvador, Ethiopia, Ghana, Iraq, Ireland, Lebanon, Saint Lucia, Trinidad and Tobago, and Zambia. Iraq last competed in 1972, which makes the country's first time to compete after four decades of withdrawing from Miss Universe. Zambia last competed in 2010, Egypt, Ethiopia, Saint Lucia, and Trinidad and Tobago last competed in 2014, while the others last competed in 2015. Belize, Denmark, Hungary, Kenya, Kosovo, Sierra Leone, and Switzerland withdrew. Sierra Leone withdrew from the competition after Adama Kargbo was unable to secure a visa in time for the competition in the United States. Belize, Denmark, Hungary, Kenya, Kosovo, and Switzerland withdrew after their respective organizations failed to hold a national competition or appoint a delegate.

Results

Placements

Special awards

Pageant

Format
For the first time in this edition, contestants were divided into three geographical regions: The Americas, Europe, and Africa & Asia-Pacific. The judges chose the top four contestants from each of the three regions, as well as four other contestants from any region to advance to the Top 16. The Top 16 participated in the swimsuit competition, with 10 advancing in the competition for the evening gown competition. Five contestants advanced into the Top 5, and participated in the question and answer portion. From five, three advanced into the Final 3 and participated in the final question and the final walk.

Selection committee

Preliminary competition
 Cecilio Asuncion – Slay Models director and founder
 Morgan Deane – TAO restaurant group marketing director
 Wendy Fitzwilliam – Miss Universe 1998 from Trinidad and Tobago
 Isabelle Lindblom – IMG Models scout
 Megan Olivi – Fox Sports 1 host and reporter
 Bill Pereira – CEO, president, and co-chairman of IDT Telecom

Final telecast
 Wendy Fitzwilliam – Miss Universe 1998 from Trinidad and Tobago
 Jay Manuel – television host, creative director, and makeup artist
 Farouk Shami - businessman, owner of Farouk Systems
 Ross Mathews – television personality
 Megan Olivi – Fox Sports 1 host and reporter
 Lele Pons – Vine and YouTube personality
 Pia Wurtzbach – Miss Universe 2015 from the Philippines

Contestants

92 contestants competed for the title.

Notes

References 

2017 beauty pageants
2017 in Nevada
Beauty pageants in the United States
November 2017 events in the United States
2017
Zappos Theater